Bhave is an Indian family name. It is a surname that is found in the Chitpawan Brahmin community of Maharashtra.

Notable
Bhave of Ramdurg State - Rulers of the Princely state during British era
Vaman Prabhakar Bhave - One of the founders of Bhave High School in Pune
Vishnudas Bhave  (-1901)- Regarded as the founder of the modern Marathi Musical theatre
Vinoba Bhave (1895-1982)- Indian Freedom fighter and Social reformer
Purushottam Bhaskar Bhave - Marathi writer
Surendra Bhave - Indian cricketer
Kedar Bhave - Indian cricketer
C. B. Bhave - Indian financial regulator
Ashwini Bhave - Marathi and Hindi film actress
Subodh Bhave - Marathi film actor and director
Sunil Bhave - elected member of the Community Consolidated School District 59 Board of Education (2015-2019)

See also
Vinoba Bhave University

References

Marathi-language surnames